Augusta Anita Laura Montaruli (born 14 September 1983 in Turin) is a lawyer and an Italian politician.

See also 
 List of members of the Italian Chamber of Deputies, 2018–

References 

Living people
1983 births
Deputies of Legislature XVIII of Italy
University of Turin alumni
Brothers of Italy politicians
21st-century Italian politicians
21st-century Italian women politicians
Women members of the Chamber of Deputies (Italy)